Thomas Frederick Handel Candlyn  (December 17, 1892 – December 16, 1964) was an English-born organist, composer and choirmaster who spent most of his professional career at two Episcopal Church congregations in New York.

Candlyn was born December 17, 1892 in Davenham, Cheshire, England, the son of Thomas John Candlin, an organist. From 1908 until 1910, he was assistant organist at St George's Minster, Doncaster and studied with the church's organist, Wilfrid Sanderson. Candlyn received the Bachelor of Music degree from Durham University in 1911.

In 1915 he was offered the position of organist and choirmaster at St. Paul's Church, Albany, New York by its rector Dr. Roelif H. Brooks and he emigrated to the United States. He was to remain at St. Paul’s for twenty-eight years, with the exception of the period between September 21, 1917 and April 25, 1919 when he served with the American Expeditionary Forces (AEF) during World War I and became a corporal. On June 25, 1918 Candlyn became a United States citizen at Fort Devens, Massachusetts.

During his years in Albany, Candlyn taught at the New York State College for Teachers, as Instructor from 1921 until his appointment as Assistant Professor starting with the 1935-1936 school year. He served as chair of the music department beginning in 1924 and received an honorary Doctorate of Pedagogy (Pd.D.) from the College in June 1927. Candlyn edited the compilation The Songs of New York State College for Teachers, published by H.W. Gray Company in 1923. He founded the Albany Oratorio Society and conducted the Mendelssohn Club of Albany during its 1939-1940 and 1940-1941 seasons.

In 1943, Dr. Brooks (who had left Albany in 1926) offered Candlyn the position of organist and choirmaster at St. Thomas Episcopal Church, New York. Candlyn worked at St. Thomas until his retirement in 1954.

After his retirement from St. Thomas, Candlyn was the organist and choirmaster at Trinity Church, Roslyn, (Long Island) New York.

Candlyn composed two hundred works, primarily anthems, cantatas, service settings and organ solos. Three of his anthems ("Christ, whose glory fills the skies," "Thee We Adore," and "King of Glory, King of Peace") remain part of the standard repertoire of Episcopal church choirs in North America.

He is buried at Long Island National Cemetery, East Farmingdale, New York.

Prizes
Clemson Gold Medal for the anthem "O come, O come, Emmanuel", 1919
Strawbridge Clothier Prize, 1923
The Philadelphia Sesqui-Centennial International Exhibition (category A Capella Suite) for "The Historical Suite", 1925
The Audsley Memorial Medal of the National Association of Organists for "Sonata Dramatica", 1926
Guild of Organists Prize for the cantata "The Light of the World"

Sources
"T.F.H. Candlyn, 72, Church Organist," The New York Times December 18, 1964
“Albany Organist Gets Position at St. Thomas”, The New York Times August 6, 1943
“Church Organist Gets Son’s Medal”, The New York Times November 12, 1945
Materials from the archives of the University at Albany: Minutes of the Board of Trustees for June 6, 1927; Executive Committee Minutes, Volume 4, 1924 – 1939, page 1180; New York State College for Teachers Annual Catalogue

Catherine R. Rogers, "Cultural Contributions of Albanians" (1933 M.A. thesis, New York State Teachers' College), pages 110-112

References

1892 births
1964 deaths
20th-century English composers
20th-century organists
20th-century British male musicians
Burials at Long Island National Cemetery
Military personnel from Cheshire
English classical organists
British male organists
Alumni of Durham University
People from Davenham
People from Point Lookout, New York
University at Albany, SUNY faculty
United States Army non-commissioned officers
United States Army personnel of World War I
Male classical organists